Saint-Alexandre-de-Kamouraska is a municipality in the Canadian province of Quebec, in the Kamouraska Regional County Municipality.

Before July 5, 1997, it was known simply as Saint-Alexandre.

History
The parish of Saint-Alexandre was founded in the first half of the 19th century. It was canonically erected in 1851. The post office was first opened in 1854 under the name "Saint-Alexandre-de-Kamouraska". The parish municipality of Saint-Alexandre was then created in 1855. In 1997, its status was changed to a municipality alongside its name, which became Saint-Alexandre-de-Kamouraska.

Geography

Lakes and rivers
The following waterways pass through or are situated within the municipality's boundaries:
Lac Morin – located along the municipality's southern border.
Le Petit Lac
Petite rivière Noire
Rivière Carrier
Rivière Fourchue

See also
 List of municipalities in Quebec

References

External links
 

Municipalities in Quebec
Incorporated places in Bas-Saint-Laurent